The 1995–96 Maltese Premier League was the 16th season of the Maltese Premier League, and the 81st season of top-tier football in Malta.  It was contested by 10 teams, and Sliema Wanderers F.C. won the championship.

League standings

Results

References
Malta - List of final tables (RSSSF)

Maltese Premier League seasons
Malta
1995–96 in Maltese football